Virginio Vairo is an Italian automobile designer who has collaborated with Carrozzeria Vignale.

Designs

 1964 Fiat 1300 and 1500 Sportiva fastback. 
 1964 Fiat 850 Coupé, Spider, Berlina (derived from Giovanni Michelotti designs).
 1965 Fiat 1500 Coupé (derived from Giovanni Michelotti designs).
 1965 Maserati Mexico prototype, based on a Maserati 5000 GT chassis.
 1966 Maserati Mexico 
 1967 Fiat 125 Coupé Samantha 
 1967 Fiat 124 Coupé Eveline
 1967 Jensen Nova concept car
 1968 Matra M530 Sport Vignale prototype
 1968 Maserati Indy

References

Italian automobile designers
Living people
Year of birth missing (living people)